Boomtown was a children's show on WBZ-TV in Boston, Massachusetts that ran Saturday and Sunday mornings from 1956 through 1974.

The show was a live, three-hour, weekend morning broadcast hosted by singing cowboy Rex Trailer. The first hour of the show always took place in the "bunkhouse" set, where Trailer and sidekick(s) would engage in slapstick comedy and tomfoolery. There was a practical reason for this segment. Although the kids at home were awake and ready to watch early, it would have been too difficult to have the young studio audience in place for that 7 a.m. opening. Trailer would then mount his horse, Goldrush, and (in a stock introductory sequence accompanied by his dramatic song, "Hoofbeats") ride across a "prairie wide" onto the western-themed Boomtown studio set to interact with his live audience for the other two hours. Somehow, he and his crew were able to convincingly re-create the Old West on Soldiers Field Road in Brighton for generations of viewers.

With a natural ease and charisma, Trailer led his young studio audience (or "posse") in contests of skill and singalongs. Trailer also regularly demonstrated his considerable cowboy skills, which he picked up while spending his childhood summers on his grandfather's ranch in Texas. In addition, Rex Trailer worked with guests who made educational presentations; took part in skits; and introduced the cartoons that rounded out the program, including Popeye, Davey and Goliath, Gumby, The Mighty Hercules among others. He was aided on the show by a succession of sidekicks over the years, including Pablo (played by Dick Kilbride), Cactus Pete, Sgt. Billy, Terrence Currier and Bill O'Brien, respectively.

One recurring, memorable segment of Boomtown was set to the music of Hey, Look Me Over. Rex would appoint two children sheriff and deputy, and hand them a wanted poster showing another member of the studio audience thinly disguised. As the music played, the entire "posse" would march through the sheriff's office, waving for the camera (and for their families and friends watching; the segment ensured that every child had a chance to be on screen at least once). Trying for a prize, the young lawmen would attempt to pick out the person shown on the poster as he passed through the office.

Trailer had moved from Philadelphia (where his TV series had ended) to Boston to host Boomtown on a short-term contract, but the show ended up running for almost two decades. Two-hundred thousand children appeared on Boomtown during its run, and another four million watched on TV or saw Rex at his many personal appearances across New England. Trailer essentially played himself, so he was never caught out of character: kind, quietly confident, eminently capable, and wholesome. Parents and children alike responded to Boomtown's subtle, integral messages encouraging respect for others and nature. Rex Trailer settled in the Boston area permanently where he remained a major local celebrity decades after the final episode of Boomtown aired. Trailer died in 2013.

Trailer opened and closed each installment of the show with a live rendition of the Boomtown theme, a song that is said to have been "as sticky as the molasses used for grandma’s cookies on the old frontier." His audience participated by miming the shooting of a pistol into the air as they raucously sang along to the refrain of "Boom- Boom- Boomtown!" The complete lyrics to the song, Boomtown, are:

Howdy there, folks, we're glad to meet you in
Boom- Boom- Boomtown!

There's a bunch of folks who'd like to greet you in
Boom- Boom- Boomtown!

You can bet we'll have lots of Western fun
And excitement for you

We'll ride and rope, do a square dance and shoot a gun
And we'll sing a song or two

Come along, folks, now we're gonna start the fun in
Boom- Boom- Boomtown!

From six to sixty there's something for everyone in
Boom- Boom- Boomtown!

So do-si-do and swing around,
Get your gal and promenade down to
Boom- Boom- Boomtown!

Boomtown ran on WBZ-TV until the last day of 1974. Trailer and some of his associates briefly moved the show to a fledgling UHF station, Channel 25, but that station lacked the facilities to recapture the show's glory and audience. In the 1990s, Trailer and Sgt. Billy moseyed on over to cable television with a retrospective series called Boomtown Revisited.

Little footage exists of Boomtown because the shows were mostly broadcast live, and any segments that were recorded were routinely taped over after broadcast.

However, a documentary film titled Rex Trailer's Boomtown was produced by Milford, Massachusetts native Michael Bavaro. Bavaro used rare archival footage along with the memories of Boomtown fans to provide a nostalgic overview. The Emmy® nominated film aired on WBZ-TV on June 18, 2005 with encore broadcasts on WGBH in 2010, 2013, and is now sold in DVD format.

Notes

External links
Rex Trailer - official site

Local children's television programming in the United States
1956 American television series debuts
1974 American television series endings
1950s American children's television series
1960s American children's television series
1970s American children's television series